Halcyon is an extinct town in Dent County, in the U.S. state of Missouri.

A post office called Halcyon was established in 1903, and remained in operation until 1905. The community took its name from Halcyon, a character in Greek mythology.

References

Ghost towns in Missouri
Former populated places in Dent County, Missouri